The  is a series of articulated trams built by Tokyu Car Corporation in 1999 for the Tōkyū Setagaya Line.

Technical specifications

History
The trains entered revenue service on 11 July 1999.

Livery variations
In commemoration of the 110th anniversary of the Tamagawa Electric Railway in April 2017, set 305 received a special wrapping. For the 50th anniversary of the Setagaya Line in May 2019, set 308 received a cat-themed wrapping.

From 10 April 2022, a 300 series set is due to receive a special livery to commemorate the 100th anniversary of Tokyu Corporation's founding.

References

External links

Tokyu rolling stock information (archived on September 9, 2015) 

Electric multiple units of Japan
Tokyu Corporation
Train-related introductions in 1999
600 V DC multiple units
Tokyu Car multiple units